Perry N. Vekroff (June 3, 1881 – January 3, 1937) was an American film director, screenwriter and actor of the silent era. He directed 19 films between 1914 and 1922, including two film serials for the Universal Film Manufacturing Company and one for Pathé. He was born in Shumen, Bulgaria and died in Hollywood, California.

Selected filmography
  (1914)
 Richard the Brazen (1917)
 Men (1918)
 A Woman's Experience (1919)
 In Honor's Web (1919)
 Trailed by Three (1920)
 The Secret Four (1921)
 Perils of the Yukon (1922)
 Thundergate (1923)
 What Wives Want (1923)
 A Soldier's Plaything (1930)

References

External links

1881 births
1937 deaths
People from Shumen
American film directors
American male screenwriters
Silent film screenwriters
American male film actors
American male silent film actors
Bulgarian emigrants to the United States
20th-century American male actors
20th-century American male writers
20th-century American screenwriters